Allium parryi is a North American species of wild onion known by the common names Parry's onion and Parry's fringed onion. It is common in the Coast Ranges of southern California and northern Baja California. It is also known from the southernmost reaches of the Sierra Nevada.

Allium parryi produceds a reddish-brown bulb roughly a centimeter long. It produces a short stem up to a maximum height of about 20 centimeters and a single cylindrical leaf which is generally a bit longer. The inflorescence contains up to 50 pink-veined white flowers which turn darker pink as they age. Each flower has narrow tepals less than a centimeter long.

References

External links
Calphoto Photo gallery

parryi
Flora of California
Flora of Baja California
Natural history of the Peninsular Ranges
Natural history of the Transverse Ranges
~
Plants described in 1879
Taxa named by Sereno Watson
Flora without expected TNC conservation status